Major-General Sir Charles Offley Harvey, CB, CVO, CBE, MC (16 July 1888 – 11 October 1969) was an officer in the British Indian Army during World War I and World War II.

He was appointed CVO in 1922 for performing the duties of Assistant Military Secretary to the Prince of Wales during His Royal Highness's Indian Tour.

In the Anglo-Soviet invasion of Persia, he commanded 8th Indian Infantry Division, part of Paiforce.

He was knighted in 1946 for his services as Military Adviser in Chief to the Indian State Forces.

He was assistant managing director of the Guinness Brewery with responsibility for personnel 1946-1961 and the founding chairman of the Irish Management Institute 1952-1956. He is commemorated in the IMI's Sir Charles Harvey Awards, conferred on leading MBA graduates in Irish universities.

Army career
 Commissioned 1908
 38th King George's Own Central India Horse 1909
 Commanding Officer Central India Horse (1933–1936)
 General Staff Officer 1 Meerut District, India (1936–1939)
 Commanding Officer Wana Brigade, Waziristan, India (1939–1940)
 General Officer Commanding 8th Indian Infantry Division (1940–1942)
 Military Adviser in Chief Indian States Forces (1943–1946)
 Retired 1946

Business career 
He was assistant managing director of the Guinness Brewery with responsibility for personnel from 1946-1961 and the founding chairman of the Irish Management Institute from 1952-1956. He is commemorated in the IMI's Sir Charles Harvey Awards, conferred on leading MBA graduates in Irish universities.[2]

Bibliography
 Duffy, Martin (2012) The Trade Union Pint: The Unlikely Union of Guinness and the Larkins. Dublin: Liberties Press.

References

External links
Generals of World War II
 Indian Army Officers 1939−1945

1888 births
1969 deaths
Indian Army generals of World War II
Indian Army personnel of World War I
Recipients of the Military Cross
Companions of the Order of the Bath
Commanders of the Order of the British Empire
Commanders of the Royal Victorian Order
People educated at Marlborough College
Graduates of the Royal Military College, Sandhurst
Highland Light Infantry officers
Graduates of the Staff College, Quetta
People from Eastbourne
Military personnel from Sussex
British Indian Army generals